The women's all-around competition for gymnastics artistic at the 2019 Southeast Asian Games in Philippines was held on 2 December 2019 at Rizal Memorial Coliseum.

Farah Ann Abdul Hadi from Malaysia won the gold, followed by silver won by Rifda Irfanaluthfi from Indonesia and bronze won by Tan Ing Yueh from Malaysia.

Results

References

Women's artistic all-around